Loomis is an unincorporated community and census-designated place (CDP) in Isabella County in the U.S. state of Michigan. The population was 213 at the 2010 census.

Geography
Loomis is in Wise Township in the northeastern corner of Isabella County. U.S. Highway 10, a four-lane freeway, forms the northern border of the community. US 10 leads northwest  to Clare and southeast  to Midland.

The community is part of the Salt River watershed, which in turn is part of the Tittabawassee River basin draining southeast to the Saginaw River.

Demographics

References

Unincorporated communities in Isabella County, Michigan
Census-designated places in Michigan
Unincorporated communities in Michigan
Census-designated places in Isabella County, Michigan